Mordellistena gina is a beetle in the genus Mordellistena of the family Mordellidae. It was described in 1967 by Nomura.

References

gina
Beetles described in 1967